Subject to Change is the fourth studio album by American country pop artist Kelsea Ballerini. The album was released on September 23, 2022, through Black River Entertainment. Ballerini co-produced the album along with Shane McAnally, Julian Bunetta, Jesse Frasure, and Alyssa Vanderheym. "Heartfirst" was released as its first single on April 8, 2022.

Background
Ballerini first announced the album in July 2022. Ballerini had hinted that there was a collaboration on the album, and on September 8, 2022, confirmed that the song, "You're Drunk, Go Home" featured Kelly Clarkson and Carly Pearce. Ballerini co-wrote on fourteen tracks, and sole wrote one.

The albums track listing is "90s-inspired", and shows her growth as an artist. Some songs on the album are  described as "breezy pop" and "super fun, honky tonk-style". Talking about the composition of the album, Ballerini explained to Billboard that she "intentionally wanted to write with more women this time. For me, when you are making a record about emotions, when you connect with a woman creatively, you’re gonna be able to tap into that in a whole different way". She noted that the writing process for her 2021 poetry book Feel Your Way Through influenced her songwriting for Subject to Change, stating that "I credit a lot of the openness and the more poetic side of the songwriting to the book. I feel like that opened my mind creatively and helped me work outside of the [standard song] structure. That creative freedom unlocked a part of me I hope to keep pushing in any kind of project that I do". She also described The Corrs, Shania Twain, Trisha Yearwood, Sixpence None the Richer and Sheryl Crow as key influences for the album.

Critical reception
Steven Thomas Ervin of AllMusic gave the album four out of five stars. He says, "Subject to Change is simultaneously glossy and softly lit, an album with plenty of modern electric flair. "

Compared to her previous album, Jeffrey Davies of PopMatters wrote that the album's material has "moved backward as bland" and described Subject to Change as Ballerini's most conservative work to date. However, he praised her vocals as the strongest they've ever been and observed that she is "is in her element musically."

Rachel Kovach of The Penn calls it a "stellar album that is certainly Grammy worthy."

Rolling Stone Dan Hyman said that the album is "mature and refreshing" and that it features some of her "most sonically progressive material to date."

Singles
The lead single "Heartfirst" was released on April 8, 2022. It debuted at number 24 on the Billboard Country Airplay chart, and ultimately reached a peak of number 23. "If You Go Down (I'm Goin' Down Too)" was released on December 5, 2022, as the album's second single.

"Love Is a Cowboy" was released as the first promotional single on July 15, 2022. "The Little Things" and "What I Have" were also issued ahead of the album release.

Promotion
On September 23, 2022, she appeared on Good Morning America and performed "Heartfirst". On September 27, 2022, Ballerini performed "Love Is a Cowboy" on The Late Late Show with James Corden. She performed "What I Have" on The Kelly Clarkson Show on September 30, 2022

Tour
She promoted the album on the ten date Heartfirst Tour, which began on September 24, 2022, in New York City.

Track listing
All tracks produced by Kelsea Ballerini, Shane McAnally and Julian Bunetta, with the exception of "Love Is a Cowboy", produced alongside Jesse Frasure, and "Doin' My Best", produced alongside Alyssa Vanderheym.

Personnel
Vocals

Kelsea Ballerini – lead vocals, background vocals
Cary Barlowe – background vocals
Julian Bunetta – background vocals
Kelly Clarkson – background vocals, featured vocals, lead vocals

Shane McAnally – background vocals
Carly Pearce – background vocals, featured vocals, lead vocals
Josh Reedy – background vocals
Alyssa Vanderheym – background vocals

Musicians

Kelsea Ballerini – clapping
Cary Barlowe – acoustic guitar
Julian Bunetta – clapping, bass guitar, electric guitar, mandolin, percussion, synthesizer
Kris Donegan – acoustic guitar, electric guitar
Jeneé Fleenor – fiddle
Evan Hutchins – drums, percussion
Sol Littlefield – acoustic guitar, clapping, electric guitar
Todd Lombardo – acoustic guitar, banjo, dobro, mandolin

Shane McAnally – clapping
Justin Schipper – clapping, dobro, steel guitar
Ilya Toshinskiy – acoustic guitar, clapping, ukulele
Derek Wells – electric guitar
Alex Wright – piano, synthesizer
Whit Wright – steel guitar
Craig Young – bass guitar, clapping

Production

Kelsea Ballerini – producer
Drew Bollman – engineer
Julian Bunetta – digital editing, producer, programming
Nathan Dantzler – mastering
Jesse Frasure – assistant engineer, producer
Ryan Gore – assistant engineer
Jeff Gunnell – assistant engineer, digital editing
Evan Hutchins – programming
Kam Lutcherhand – assistant engineer
Alyson McAnally – production coordination

Shane McAnally – producer
Joel McKenney – assistant engineer
Alyssa Vanderheym – assistant engineer, digital editing, producer, programming
Ross Vewbauer – assistant engineer
Matt Wolach – assistant engineer
Joe Zook – mixing

Imagery
Molly Dickson – styling
Ashley Kohorst – art direction, design
Daniel Prakopcyk – photography
Patrick Tracy – art direction, design

Charts

References

2022 albums 
Albums produced by Shane McAnally
Kelsea Ballerini albums
Black River Entertainment albums